Daniel Terryll Jones (August 17, 1800 – March 29, 1861) was a physician, an American politician and a U.S. Representative from New York, serving two terms in the House from 1851 to 1855.

Biography
Born in Hebron, Connecticut, Jones was the son of Daniel and Lydia White Jones. He received a liberal schooling, and graduated from the medical department of Yale College in 1826. He began the practice of his profession in Amboy, New York.

Career
Jones moved to Baldwinsville, New York, in 1841, where he continued to practice medicine and also served as Postmaster. A well-respected doctor, several prospective physicians studied with him before beginning their own practices. He married  Eliza Lawrence in Washington D. C.

Tenure in Congress 
Elected as a Democrat, representing New York's twenty-fourth district, to the Thirty-second and Thirty-third Congresses, Jones served from March 4, 1851, to March 3, 1855.  He was not a candidate for renomination in 1854.

Later career and death 
After leaving office, he resumed the practice of medicine in Baldwinsville. He became a Republican after the party was founded, and in 1858 he was Chairman of the Republican Convention at Syracuse, New York.

Death
Jones died in Baldwinsville, New York, on March 29, 1861 (age 60 years, 224 days). He is interred at Riverside Cemetery, Baldwinsville, New York.

References

External links

1800 births
1861 deaths
Yale College alumni
Democratic Party members of the United States House of Representatives from New York (state)
New York (state) Republicans
19th-century American politicians
People from Hebron, Connecticut
People from Baldwinsville, New York
Members of the United States House of Representatives from New York (state)